The 1931 Dayton Flyers football team was an American football team that represented the University of Dayton as a member of the Ohio Athletic Conference during the 1931 college football season. In its ninth season under head coach Harry Baujan, the team compiled a 5–3–2 record.

Schedule

References

Dayton
Dayton Flyers football seasons
Dayton Flyers football